Ezequiel Garré (born 10 November 1981 in Buenos Aires, Argentina) is an Argentine former professional footballer who played as a defender.

Personal life
He is the first son of the Argentine coach Oscar Garré, the brother of Argentine footballer Emiliano Garré and uncle of Benjamín Garré.

Clubs
 Deportes Concepción 2003
 Portimonense 2003–2004
 Chacarita Juniors 2005
 San Martín de Mendoza 2006
 Ilisiakos 2006–2007
 Gimnasia y Esgrima de Jujuy 2007
 Ilisiakos 2008–2009
 C.A.I. 2009–2010
 Almirante Brown 2011–2014
 Argentinos Juniors 2014–2016
 Patronato 2016
 Huracán 2016–2018
 Tigre 2018

References

External links
 
 
 

1981 births
Living people
Argentine footballers
Association football defenders
Primera B de Chile players
Argentine Primera División players
Primera Nacional players
Liga Portugal 2 players
Deportes Concepción (Chile) footballers
Portimonense S.C. players
Chacarita Juniors footballers
San Martín de Mendoza footballers
Ilisiakos F.C. players
Gimnasia y Esgrima de Jujuy footballers
Comisión de Actividades Infantiles footballers
Club Almirante Brown footballers
Argentinos Juniors footballers
Club Atlético Patronato footballers
Club Atlético Huracán footballers
Club Atlético Tigre footballers
Argentine expatriate footballers
Argentine expatriate sportspeople in Chile
Expatriate footballers in Chile
Argentine expatriate sportspeople in Greece
Expatriate footballers in Greece
Argentine expatriate sportspeople in Portugal
Expatriate footballers in Portugal
Footballers from Buenos Aires